The United States Department of Transportation (USDOT or DOT) is one of the executive departments of the U.S. federal government. It is headed by the secretary of transportation, who reports directly to the president of the United States and is a member of the president's Cabinet.

The department's mission is "to develop and coordinate policies that will provide an efficient and economical national transportation system, with due regard for need, the environment, and the national defense."

History

Prior to the creation of the Department of Transportation, its functions were administered by the under secretary of commerce for transportation. In 1965, Najeeb Halaby, administrator of the Federal Aviation Agency (predecessor to the Federal Aviation Administration, FAA), suggested to President Lyndon B. Johnson that transportation be elevated to a cabinet-level post, and that the FAA be folded into the DOT. 

It was established by Congress in the Department of Transportation Act on October 15, 1966. The department began operation on April 1, 1967.

The idea of having a federal department of transportation was first proposed by former president Woodrow Wilson in 1921–22.

Agencies
 Federal Aviation Administration (FAA)
 Federal Highway Administration (FHWA)
 Federal Motor Carrier Safety Administration (FMCSA)
 Federal Railroad Administration (FRA)
 Federal Transit Administration (FTA)
 Maritime Administration (MARAD)
 National Highway Traffic Safety Administration (NHTSA)
 Office of Inspector General (OIG)
 Office of the Secretary of Transportation (OST)
 Pipeline and Hazardous Materials Safety Administration (PHMSA)
 Saint Lawrence Seaway Development Corporation (SLSDC)
 John A. Volpe National Transportation Systems Center
 Bureau of Transportation Statistics (BTS)

Former agencies
 Transportation Security Administration – transferred to Department of Homeland Security in 2003
 United States Coast Guard – transferred to Department of Homeland Security in 2003
 Surface Transportation Board (STB) – spun off as an independent federal agency in 2015

Budget 
In 2012, the DOT awarded $742.5 million in funds from the American Recovery and Reinvestment Act to 11 transit projects. The awardees include light rail projects. Other projects include both a commuter rail extension and a subway project in New York City, and a bus rapid transit system in Springfield, Oregon. The funds subsidize a heavy rail project in northern Virginia, completing the Washington Metropolitan Area Transit Authority's Metro Silver Line to connect Washington, D.C., and the Washington Dulles International Airport.  (DOT had previously agreed to subsidize the Silver Line construction to Reston, Virginia.)

President Barack Obama's budget request for 2010 also included $1.83 billion in funding for major transit projects. More than $600 million went towards ten new or expanding transit projects. The budget provided additional funding for all of the projects currently receiving Recovery Act funding, except for the bus rapid transit project. It also continued funding for another 18 transit projects that are either currently under construction or soon will be. Following the same, the Consolidated Appropriations Act of 2014 delegated $600 million for Infrastructure Investments, referred to as  Discretionary Grants.

The Department of Transportation was authorized a budget for Fiscal Year 2016 of $75.1 billion. The budget authorization is broken down as follows:

In 2021, President Joe Biden signed the Infrastructure Investment and Jobs Act. The $1.2 trillion act included over $250 billion in funding for transportation-related infrastructure projects.

Related legislation

 1806 – Cumberland Road
 1862 – Pacific Railway Act
 1887 – Interstate Commerce Act
 1916 – Adamson Railway Labor Act
 1935 – Motor Carrier Act
 1946 – Federal Airport Act, 
 1950 – Federal Aid to Highway, 
 1954 – Saint Lawrence Seaway Act
 1956 – Federal-Aid to Highway/Interstate Highway Act, 
 1957 – Airways Modernization Act, 
 1958 – Transportation Act of 1958, 
 1958 – Federal Aviation Act, 
 1959 – Airport Construction Act, 
 1964 – Urban Mass Transportation Act, 
 1965 – Highway Beautification Act, 
 1966 – Department of Transportation established, 
 1970 – Urban Mass Transportation Act, 
 1970 – Rail Passenger Service Act PL 91-518
 1970 – Airport and Airway Development Act PL 91-258
 1973 – Federal Aid Highway Act PL 93-87
 1973 – Amtrak Improvement Act PL 93-146
 1973 – Federal Aid Highway Act PL 93-87
 1974 – National Mass Transportation Assistance Act PL 93-503
 1976 – Railroad Revitalization and Regulatory Reform Act PL 94-210
 1976 – Hart-Scott-Rodino Antitrust Improvements Act PL 94-435
 1978 – Airline Deregulation Act PL 95-504
 1980 – Motor Carrier Act PL 96-296
 1980 – Staggers Rail Act PL 96-448
 1982 – Transportation Assistance Act PL 97-424
 1982 – Bus Regulatory Reform Act PL 97-261
 1984 – Commercial Space Launch Act PL 98-575
 1987 – Surface Transportation Act PL 100-17
 1991 – Intermodal Surface Transportation Efficiency Act PL 102-240
 1998 – Transportation Equity Act for the 21st Century PL 105-178
 2000 – Wendell H. Ford Aviation Investment and Reform Act for the 21st Century PL 106-181
 2001 – Aviation and Transportation Security Act (PL 107-71)
 2002 – Homeland Security Act (PL 107-296)
 2005 – Safe, Accountable, Flexible, Efficient Transportation Equity Act: A Legacy for Users (PL 109-59)
 2012 – Moving Ahead for Progress in the 21st Century Act (MAP-21) PL 112-141
 2015 – Fixing America's Surface Transportation Act (FAST Act) PL 114-94
 2021 - Infrastructure Investment and Jobs Act PL 117-58

Freedom of Information Act processing performance
In the latest Center for Effective Government analysis of 15 federal agencies which receive the most Freedom of Information Act FOIA requests, published in 2015 (using 2012 and 2013 data, the most recent years available), the Department of Transportation earned a D by scoring 65 out of a possible 100 points, i.e., did not earn a satisfactory overall grade.

See also

 American Highway Users Alliance
 National Highway System (United States)
 National Transportation Safety Board
 Passenger vehicles in the United States
 Title 23 of the Code of Federal Regulations
 Transportation in the United States
 Transportation policy of the United States
 Turner-Fairbank Highway Research Center
 United States Federal Maritime Commission
 United States Secretary of Transportation

References

External links

 
 Department of Transportation on USAspending.gov
 United States Department of Transportation in the Federal Register

 
Transportation government agencies of the United States
Government agencies established in 1966
Transportation
1966 establishments in Washington, D.C.